Israel competed at the 2015 Summer Universiade also known as the XXVIII Summer Universiade, in Gwangju, South Korea.

Men's handball

During the men's handball tournament, Israel competed and finished in 5th place.

Preliminary round - Group B

Standings

Games

5th place match

Roster
Head Coach: Shahar Haber

References

Summer Universiade
Nations at the 2015 Summer Universiade
Israel at the Summer Universiade